Berg may refer to:

People
Berg (surname), a surname (including a list of people with the name)
Berg Ng (born 1960), Hong Kong actor
Berg (footballer) (born 1989), Brazilian footballer

Former states
Berg (state), county and duchy of the Holy Roman Empire
Grand Duchy of Berg, state of the Napoleonic period

Places

Antarctica
Berg Peak, Victoria Land
Berg Bay, Victoria Land
Berg Ice Stream

Austria
Berg, Lower Austria
Berg im Drautal, in Carinthia
Berg bei Rohrbach, in Upper Austria
Berg im Attergau, in Upper Austria

France
Berg, Bas-Rhin, a municipality in the Arrondissement of Saverne
Berg-sur-Moselle, a commune in the Moselle department

Germany
Berg (state), a medieval territory in today's North Rhine-Westphalia
Grand Duchy of Berg (1806–1813), created by Emperor Napoleon
Berg, Baden-Württemberg, a district of Ravensburg, Baden-Württemberg 
Berg, Upper Franconia, a district of Hof, Bavaria
Berg, Upper Palatinate, district of Neumarkt, Bavaria
Berg, Upper Bavaria, district of Starnberg in Bavaria
Berg Castle (Bavaria)
Berg im Gau, district of Neuburg-Schrobenhausen, Bavaria
Berg im Donaugau Abbey, a historical house of the Benedictine Order in the area of Berg im Gau
Berg, Ahrweiler, municipality, district of Ahrweiler, Rhineland-Palatinate
Berg, Rhein-Lahn, municipality, district of Rhein-Lahn, Rhineland-Palatinate
Berg, Germersheim, municipality, district of Germersheim, Rhineland-Palatinate
Bergisches Land (Country or Land of Berg), a low mountain range region within the state of Nordrhein-Westfalen
Bergisch Gladbach (City of Gladbach in the “Land of Berg”)
Cities with names ending “-berg” include Nürnberg (Nuremberg) and Heidelberg

Italy
Berg, a frazione of the comune Lüsen in the Regione of Alto Adige

Luxemburg
Berg, Luxembourg, a village
Colmar-Berg, formerly "Berg"
Berg Castle in Colmar-Berg

Netherlands
Berg (Valkenburg), part of Berg en Terblijt, municipality of Valkenburg, Limburg
Berg aan de Maas, municipality of Stein, Limburg
Berg en Dal, a village in the province of Gelderland
Berg en Terblijt, a former village in the province of Limburg
Berg (North Brabant)
Berg (Margraten), a hamlet
Berg (Meijel)

Norway
Berg, Norway, a municipality
Berg, Nordland, a village in the municipality of Sømna
Berg, Østfold, a former municipality in Østfold county
Berg concentration camp
Berg, Oslo, a borough of Oslo
Berg (station), a metro station in Oslo
Berg Upper Secondary School, in Oslo
Berg skole (Trondheim), a primary school

Sweden
Berg Municipality, a town
Berg, Åtvidaberg, a locality in the municipality of Åtvidaberg
Berg, Gävle, a locality in Gävle

Switzerland
Berg, Thurgau
Berg, St. Gallen
Berg (Eggerberg)
Berg am Irchel, Zurich

Elsewhere
Berg, Alexandria, Virginia, United States
Berg Lake, in British Columbia, Canada
Berg River, Western Cape Province, South Africa
Cape Berg, Severnaya Zemlya, Russia

Businesses
Berg Automobile Company, a former manufacturer of automobiles in Cleveland, Ohio
Berg Propulsion, a Swedish company that makes maritime propellers
Berg Publishers, an academic publishing company based in Oxford, England

Other uses
Berg wind, local wind in South Africa
4528 Berg, an asteroid
Berg (novel), a 1964 book by Ann Quin
BERG (film), a 2021 film by Joke Olthaar
Berg Fighter or Berg D.I, an Austrian single-engine, single-seater fighter biplane used in World War I
Berg connector, a brand of electrical connector used in computer hardware
Berg Party, a local political party in Berg, Sweden
Berg Balance Scale, a clinical test of a person's static and dynamic balance abilities
The Berg, a proposed artificial mountain in Berlin, Germany

See also
Berg report, published by the World Bank in 1981
Barg (disambiguation)
Birg (disambiguation)
Borg (disambiguation)
Burg (disambiguation)
Bergen
Bergh